The following is an episode list for the Walt Disney Television Animation produced series Goof Troop. The series, which featured the antics and mis-adventures of Goofy, his son Max and his neighbor Pete, along with Pete's family (wife Peg, son P.J. and daughter Pistol), ran for a total of 78 episodes and 1 Christmas special.

Goof Troop was originally previewed on The Disney Channel in the spring of 1992 beginning on April 5. An hour-long premiere special "Forever Goof" aired in syndication on September 5. The next week, the series became part of The Disney Afternoon, where 65 episodes (including the premiere, rerun in two parts) were broadcast during September–December 1992. At the same time, another set of 13 episodes aired on ABC's Saturday morning lineup, simply titled ABC Saturday Morning, concurrent with the weekday syndicated episodes. During the holiday season of 1992, a primetime Christmas special was aired in syndication, separate from The Disney Afternoon.

The Disney Afternoon and ABC episodes constituted a single production season, but they are listed separately here.

Airdates given here reflect the Disney Afternoon and ABC airings - the Disney Channel preview airdates are not available.

Series overview

Episodes

Year 1: The Disney Afternoon (1992)

Year 1: ABC Saturday Morning (1992)

Holiday special 
The Goof Troop Christmas special was originally syndicated as a stand-alone special during November–December 1992; the airdate varied from market to market.

Films

References

External links
 

Lists of American children's animated television series episodes
Lists of Disney Channel television series episodes
Episodes